"Fifty-Sixty" is a song by French singer Alizée. It was released as the second single from the album Psychédélices on February, 2008. "Fifty Sixty" was the first song from the album to be leaked in the Internet.

Music and Lyrics
The music was composed by Alizée's husband, Jérémy Chatelain, with lyrics by him and Jean Fauque. The chords of the chorus follow a standard i - bVI - bIII - bVII progression. The music includes many computer effects, without having been considered completely electronic. The lyrics to Fifty-Sixty tell, in personal and metaphorical manner, of a young model under the guidance of Andy Warhol, possibly inspired by real-life story of Edie Sedgwick. The song ends with a reiteration of how she foolishly believed Andy thought that she was the most beautiful model of all.

Music video
The music video was directed by French director Yanick Saillet. It was released in early May 2008. It was released in black and white and features some colorful special effects.

The music video starts with Alizée and her friends talking and walking in the stairs of a building. While they are talking, colorful effects are shown on top of them. Later, they enter an apartment and Alizée puts on a vinyl which has the cover of the "Mademoiselle Juliette" single on it. When the music starts, effects like heels with wings flying are shown in the apartment. Alizée and her friends start picking out shoes, bags, dresses and shirts and trying them on. Then, they walk on a runway with clothes they are trying out. For the bridge of the song, Alizée and her friends walk on the runway, while Alizée sings using a megaphone. Colorful lights and effects come out of the megaphone while she sings. In between the scenes, a scene of Alizée and a band playing the song is shown. On certain parts, the heads of the band members are replaced by cartoons.

Other two music videos were produced for remixes of the song. The first remix video was directed by Rebecca Zlotowski and with art direction by House of Kids, it was produced for the David Rubato remix. The second remix video was directed by Jihad Kahwajy and was produced for the Rolf Honey remix. None of the remix videos received airplay in music channels. The three music videos (the official and the remix videos) were included in a bonus DVD for the World Tour Edition of Psychédélices.

Performances
Alizée first performed the song at a concert organized in Strasbourg, France by the television station W9. Alizée used a megaphone while performing the number's bridge. She has since performed the track on stage in Aix-En-Provance for M6 Live.

Internet distribution
According to Alizée, a member of her crew had distributed clips of the song onto the Internet without permission for the label. By the summer of 2007, clips were available in YouTube, Daily Motion and other popular Internet mediums.

She also stated that fans complained about the leaked version of the song, even though it wasn't fully finished and produced. However, the final version that appears on the album differs little from the version that leaked onto the Internet.

2008 singles
Alizée songs
Songs written by Jérémy Chatelain
2008 songs
RCA Records singles